Oxus may refer to :

Oxus River, also called the Amu Darya, Amu or Amo River,  a major river in Central Asia.
Oxus valley (disambiguation)
Oxus civilization, a bronze age civilization of central Asia
Oxus Cobra, also known as the Caspian cobra, Central Asian cobra, or Russian cobra

See also
Oxus Treasure
Transoxiana